I Am Vengeance (sometimes called just "Vengeance") is a 2018 British action film written and directed by Ross Boyask and starring Wade Barrett, Anna Shaffer, Bryan Larkin, Kevin Leslie, Gary Daniels and Keith Allen.
John Gold (Barrett), an ex-soldier turned mercenary, learns of the murder of his best friend. He sets off on a mission to find out what happens, uncovering a sinister conspiracy in his old military unit, which he determines to clear up, taking down those responsible, one by one.

Cast
Wade Barrett (credited as Stu Bennett) as John Gold
Gary Daniels as Hatcher
Anna Shaffer as Sandra
Sapphire Elia as Rose
Abby Mavers as Lucy
Bryan Larkin as Marshall
Keith Allen as Dougie
Fleur Keith as Barnes
Kevin Leslie as Dan
Sean Blowers as Bruce
Mark Griffin as Frost
Sebastian Knapp as Keith

Reception
The film has  rating on Rotten Tomatoes.  Noel Murray of the Los Angeles Times gave the film a negative review and wrote, "Aside from the British accents, there's nothing here to distinguish I Am Vengeance from any '80s/'90s straight-to-video fodder."  Bobby LePire of Film Threat gave the film 7 stars out of 10 and wrote, "I Am Vengeance does not break the mold, but it uses its tried and true formula to good effect. Decent action, interesting characters, and a fantastic cast make for a fun watch."

Sequel
The film spawned a sequel I Am Vengeance: Retaliation (2020) with Ross Boyask returning as screenwriter and director and Wade Barrett reprising his role as John Gold.

References

External links
 
 

2018 films
British action films
2018 action films
2010s English-language films
2010s British films